Henry Yeaden was an Irish Anglican priest. 

Yeaden was born in County Roscommon and educated at Trinity College, Dublin. He was Archdeacon of Achonry from 1693 to 1705.

References 

Archdeacons of Achonry
17th-century Irish Anglican priests
18th-century Irish Anglican priests
People from County Roscommon